A credit-linked note (CLN) is a form of funded credit derivative. It is structured as a security with an embedded credit default swap allowing the issuer to transfer a specific credit risk to credit investors. The issuer is not obligated to repay the debt if a specified event occurs. This eliminates a third-party insurance provider.

It is a structured note issued by a special purpose company or trust, designed to offer investors par value at maturity unless the referenced entity defaults. In the case of default, the investors receive a recovery rate. 

The trust will also have entered into a default swap with a dealer. In case of default, the dealer will pay the trust par minus the recovery rate, in exchange for an annual fee which is passed on to the investors in the form of a higher yield on their note.

The purpose of the arrangement is to pass the risk of specific default onto investors willing to bear that risk in return for the higher yield it makes available. The CLNs themselves are typically backed by very highly rated collateral, such as U.S. Treasury securities. 

The Italian dairy products giant, Parmalat, notoriously dressed up its books by creating a credit-linked note for itself, betting on its own credit worthiness.

In Hong Kong and Singapore, credit-linked notes have been marketed as "minibonds" and sold to individual investors. After Lehman Brothers, the major issuer of minibond in Hong Kong and Singapore, filed for bankruptcy in September 2008, many retail investors of minibonds claim that banks and brokers mis-sold minibonds as low-risk products.  Many banks accepted minibonds as collateral for loans and credit facilities.

Explanation 
A bank lends money to a company, XYZ, and at the time of loan issues credit-linked notes bought by investors. The interest rate on the notes is determined by the credit risk of the company XYZ. The funds the bank raises by issuing notes to investors are invested in bonds with low probability of default. If company XYZ is solvent, the bank is obligated to pay the notes in full. If company XYZ goes bankrupt, the note-holders/investors become the creditor of the company XYZ and receive the company XYZ loan. The bank in turn gets compensated by the returns on less-risky bond investments funded by issuing credit linked notes.

Emerging Market CLN 

The emerging market credit linked note, also sometimes called a “clean,” are traded by buy side clients to gain access to local debt markets for several reasons.  First, is that a direct investment in the sovereign debt may not be legal due to domicile restrictions of the country.  One instance would be the local government requiring the purchaser of debt to have a business office in the country, another instance would be tax restrictions or tariffs in countries with NDF currencies.  A fund in USD would have difficulty repatriating the currency if local restrictions or taxes made it undesirable.  When this occurs, the sell side global bank purchases the debt and structures it into a derivative note then issued to the client or clients.  The client then owns the issued security, which derives its total return from the underlying instrument.  A CDS, credit default swap, is embedded in the instrument.  It can be thought of as a fully funded total return swap where the underlying asset total return is exchanged for a funding fee as well as the cost of the issued CLN.  From a market risk perspective owning a CLN is almost identical to owning the local debt.  

However downstream, in the back office, difficulties can arise from failure to appropriately control the risks associated from the lack of data and compatibility of accounting platforms.  The issue stems from the bespoke nature of the CLN in that it is priced in USD but the underlying asset is denominated in another currency.  Secondly, the sell side may price the CLN based on the issued asset in USD.  This, in turn, does not appropriately reflect the Yield to Maturity of the underlying asset as it approaches par value at maturity.  Thirdly, the underlying asset may be inflation linked, or have periodic paydowns that compound the first and third issues mentioned before.

Notes 

Under this structure, the coupon or price of the note is linked to the performance of a reference asset. It offers borrowers a hedge against credit risk, and gives investors a higher yield on the note for accepting exposure to a specified credit event.

See also 
 Credit
 Credit derivative
 Credit derivative risks
 Credit risk
 Structured product
 Structured note
 Equity-linked note (ELN)
 Floating rate note
 Inverse floating rate note
 Market-linked note

Corporate finance
Interest-bearing instruments
Credit risk
Structured finance